The Indonesia Masters is an international badminton tournament in BWF World Tour Super 500 (Super 750 in 2021). Formerly known as the Indonesia Open Grand Prix Gold, it was first held in 2010 in Samarinda, East Kalimantan, and change its venue in different cities every year. The tournament categorized as BWF Grand Prix Gold event, and offered total prize money of US$120,000. The tournament changed its title to Indonesian Masters in 2014. Since 2018 it is held at the Istora Gelora Bung Karno in Jakarta and offers prize money of US$350,000. In 2021, the tournament got upgraded from a Super 500 to a Super 750.

Venues and host cities
 2010–2011: Palaran Badminton Sport Arena, Samarinda
 2012: Palembang Sport and Convention Center, Palembang
 2013: Among Rogo Sports Hall, Yogyakarta
 2014: Jakabaring Sport City, Palembang
 2015: Graha Cakrawala Building, State University of Malang Complex, Malang
 2016: Balikpapan Sport and Convention Center, Balikpapan
 2018–2020, 2022–2023: Istora Gelora Bung Karno, Jakarta 
 2021: Bali International Convention Center, Badung Regency

Sponsorships
 Bankaltim (Bankaltim Indonesia Open GP Gold, 2011)
 Yonex (Yonex Sunrise Indonesia Open, 2013; Yonex Sunrise Indonesia Masters, 2014–2016)
 Daihatsu (Daihatsu Indonesia Masters, 2018–present)

Winners

Multiple winners
Below is the list of the players who won multiple Indonesia Masters title:

Performances by nation

See also 
 Indonesia Open
 Indonesia Masters Super 100
 Indonesia International

References 

 
Badminton tournaments in Indonesia
Recurring sporting events established in 2010
2010 establishments in Indonesia
Annual sporting events in Indonesia